Titus Labienus was an orator and historian in the time of Augustus, nicknamed Rabienus for his vigorous style. He killed himself when the Senate had his books burned. Caligula later overrode the Senate and had the books restored.

Life 
Little is known about his early life.  He did not come from aristocracy or the influential Roman family Labieni. Instead, he grew up poor and unpopular.

Although in his youth Titus Labienus was considered unimportant, as an adult he garnered fame for his works as an historian and orator.  At the time, Rome was a new monarchy, Augustus had assumed power, and there was a lot of animosity in the air between the people who were for and those who were against the monarchy that had taken over the Roman Empire.  Continuously, people would go throughout the city of Rome and either publicly state or publish pamphlets with negative comments and accusations about the new emperor and monarchy.  Titus Labienus eagerly joined the cause against the new monarchy, "flailing Augustan order" and vigorously supported Pompey the Great (106 BC to 46 BC), a statesman and general of the late Roman Republic and opponent of Julius Caesar for forming the monarchy.

As a historian, Titus Labienus would viciously attack the different classes of Roman society, thus eventually leading to his nickname Rabienus or "rabid one", for his "furious invective". His writings were full of such controversial material that when he recited his works in public, he would have to pass over sections that were too discordant. Instead, he would allude to the missing information by saying that they were to be read after his death. Titus Labienus was also recognized throughout Rome as an important member of the academic profession or "manus orator".

As time progressed the amount of pamphlets swirling about Rome began to grow, and the Emperor Augustus began to put into place stricter regulations on writing, initially punishing any writers who attacked anyone (particularly himself), then moving to censor writings themselves.

As both an author and a professor, both changes to Roman law further angered Titus Labienus.  As an author he wanted the freedom to write what he wanted to write, not what the government wanted or would allow.  And as a professor, he wanted to be able to teach the truth, not just what the Roman government wanted people to know. In general, the loss of freedom of speech aggravated Titus Labienus impelling him to voice his disapproval even more of the new monarchy.  As even more time progressed, Augustus became even stricter until he finally created a new type of punishment for this "new crime" of voicing one's opinion.  With this new type of punishment, depending on how guilty one was or how serious the crime one committed against the state was, either one or all of one's life works were to be burned at the stake. When the new law was first declared, even members of the Senate thought that was "an unusual way of inflicting punishment upon scholarship".

It was the professors, like Titus Labienus, who began to feel the effects of the new law first because it was also illegal to even own, carry, or read any of the restricted material that was to be burned at the stake. His conflict with the government eventually led to his own trial (6 to 8 AD), the first of its kind, where the senate found him guilty of harming the state and literary treason and as the law stated, his life's work was sentenced to the stake.

Death 

Upon hearing the verdict that he was guilty of literary treason and that his entire library was sentenced to flames, Titus Labienus decided to kill himself.  He went to the mausoleum of his ancestors, walled himself up, and committed suicide, becoming the first Roman martyr. He refused his friends' offers to cremate his body for he was not going to let the fiery element that had devoured his works touch him. Through his death, he was able to send a message about censorship to both Augustus, the emperor of Rome, and to Roman citizens.

Overall Significance 
By becoming the first Roman martyr and dying in such a dramatic fashion, Titus was able to bring attention to his cause and therefore rally more support.  He had the academic world upset because he made them realize the tragic implications of having everything censored by the government.  He made them think about all of the other classic writers who if they had been alive during this would have also had their works burned.   He caused classrooms to discuss and debate the implications of his trial.  He even got his enemy, Cassius Severus, to declare that if they wanted to destroy the works of Titus Labienus, they would have to burn him alive as well because he knew them by heart.

Two emperors later, Caligula began reversing some of the damage Augustus caused when he was in power.  He permitted the works of Titus Labienus, along with a couple other authors' works (including Cassius Severus), to be hunted down and read again, claiming that it was in his own best interest to have all events recorded for future reference.

Although, at the time of his death, he thought the damage of the flames was irreversible and that all of his life's work was gone, many of his friends and fellow scholars risked their lives to save his works.  Because of the risks they took, fifty years later his works were listed as standard classroom material by Quintilian.

See also
 Labiena (gens)

References

Bibliography 
Barrett, Anthony A., Caligula The Corruption of Power. New Haven, CT: Yale UP, 1990. 66–67.
Hornblower, Simon, and Spawforth, Anthony. "Labienus, Titus." Def. 2. The Oxford Classical Dictionary. New York: Oxford University Press, 1996.
Cramer, Frederick H. “Book Burning and Censorship in Ancient Rome: A Chapter from the History of Freedom of Speech”. JSTOR. Lucas Family Library, Atherton. 29 November 2008 .
Fantham, Elaine, Roman Literary Culture : From Cicero to Apuleius. New York: Johns Hopkins UP, 1999. 124–24. Google. 29 Nov. 2008 - available on Google Books
"Pompey the Great." Encyclopædia Britannica. 2008. Encyclopædia Britannica Online School Edition. 29 November 2008.

Latin historians
1st-century Romans
1st-century historians
Labieni